Estill is a town in Hampton County, South Carolina, United States. The population was 2,040 at the 2010 census.

Geography
The major industries are timber and agriculture.

History

The town of Estill is located in the southern half of Hampton County. The town is named for Colonel John Holbrook Estill.  Estill was formed in 1900 when the railroad, later Seaboard Air Line Railroad, needed a rail line between Augusta, Georgia and Savannah, Georgia. Upon construction of the rail line, the new town of Estill was incorporated in 1905.

The John Lawton House and Lawtonville Baptist Church are listed on the National Register of Historic Places.

Federal Correctional Institution, Estill is located near the town.

2020 Tornado 

In the early morning hours of April 13, 2020, a large, violent EF4 Tornado struck areas just south of Estill. The tornado (which packed winds of 175 MPH) killed 5 and injured around 60 people. The nearby community of Nixville, South Carolina suffered a direct hit from the tornado, and sustained the brunt of the twister's impacts.  The Federal Correctional Institution, Estill also sustained damage, resulting in many of the prison's inmates being temporarily transferred to the United States Penitentiary, Lewisburg in Lewisburg, Pennsylvania. The tornado was the first violent tornado in South Carolina since 1995.

Education
There are four schools in the town: Estill High, Estill Middle, and Estill Elementary, all of which are a part of Hampton County's School District 2, and Patrick Henry Academy, a private school.

Demographics

2020 census

As of the 2020 United States census, there were 1,821 people, 889 households, and 620 families residing in the town.

2010 census
As of the census of 2010, there were 2,040 people, residing in the town. The racial makeup of the town was 16.0% White, 77.7% African American, 0.6% Native American, 0.1% from other races, and 0.7% from two or more races. Hispanic or Latino of any race were 4.8% of the population.

There were 909 households, in which 79.5% were occupied and 20.5% were vacant.

In the town, the population was comprised by 30.8% under the age of 18, 11.5% from 20 to 29, 10.3% from 30 to 39, 12.0% from 40 to 49, and 12.6% from 50 to 59, 11.9% from 60 to 69 and 10.85% over 69 years old.

References

External links

Towns in Hampton County, South Carolina
Towns in South Carolina
1900 establishments in South Carolina